György Pólik (born 9 September 1939) is a former Hungarian basketball player. He competed in the men's tournament at the 1960 Summer Olympics, and the 1964 Summer Olympics.

References

1939 births
Living people
Hungarian men's basketball players
Olympic basketball players of Hungary
Basketball players at the 1960 Summer Olympics
Basketball players at the 1964 Summer Olympics
Basketball players from Budapest